Gary R. Sukut (born February 27, 1941) is an American politician in the state of North Dakota. He was a member of the North Dakota House of Representatives, representing the 1st district. A Republican, he was first elected in 2007. An alumnus of University of North Dakota (BA, MA), he is a retired businessman and former President of the Williston Chamber of Commerce.

References

1941 births
Living people
North Dakota Republicans
University of North Dakota alumni
21st-century American politicians